Shatta Rako is a Ghanaian dance hall and afrobeats musician, graphic designer and the CEO of Legend Studios.

Rako won the Songwriter of the Year at the 2016 BASS Awards.

Early life and education 

Shatta Rako was born to Charles Amoah and Mercy Mensah. He had his secondary school education at the Adisadel College where he started music.

Personal life 

Rexford Kojo Amoah was born on 12 November 1979 in Agona Mankrong, a village in the Central Region of Ghana to Mr Justice Charles Amoah and Ms Mercy Mensah!

He started his basic education at CRIG Primary School and attended Junior High School at CRIG JSS, both in New Tafo, in the Eastern Region of Ghana. He then Perused a Visual Art course at Adisadel College, Cape Coast – Ghana. In Adisadel College he joined the School Choir and was an active member until he left the school in 1997.

He gained admission to the College of Art faculty of the Kwame Nkrumah University of Science and Technology, in 1999 where he continued his love for music and entertainment by working as a radio show host and DJ on Contatto radio amongst presenters like Blakk Rasta, and Norcus.

He moved to London in 2003 where he continued his radio and music business as a stuff team player  of Rainbow Radio alongside his work as a professional Graphic Designer.

Music career 
Shatta Rako's music career started in 2005 with the release of his debut single Nfoni after he returned from UK which became and instant hit.

Shatta Rako is married to Naa Adukwei.

Discography

Singles

References 

1979 births
Living people
Alumni of Adisadel College
Ghanaian Afrobeat musicians
Dancehall musicians